The Irving Literary Society (also known as the Irving Literary Association or simply The Irving) was a literary society at Cornell University active from 1868 to 1887. The U.S. Bureau of Education described it as a "purely literary society" following the "traditions of the old literary societies of Eastern universities."  During the period when the Cornell literary societies flourished, the Irving and its peers produced literature at a rate higher than the campus average for the next generation, leading commentators at the turn of the 20th century to question whether academic standards had fallen since the university's founding. Named after the American writer Washington Irving, the Irving Literary Society was founded on October 20, 1868, shortly after Cornell opened. Past members who went on to prominent careers included Judge Morris Lyon Buchwalter, Senator Joseph Benson Foraker, and the journalists John Andrew Rea and Francis Whiting Halsey. The Irving's last public meeting was held on May 23, 1887. After that it ceased to exist as a Cornell University student society.  However, the New York Alpha Chapter of the Phi Kappa Psi undergraduate fraternity at Cornell claims to have "served as steward of the Irving Literary Society
since 1888".

History

Founding

A preliminary meeting chaired to organize the Society was held Room No. 4, Cascadilla Place, on October 20, 1868, some thirteen days after Cornell University opened its doors. The second business meeting followed on November 7 with George F. Behringer as President when the society's name was discussed with members equally between the John Bright Brotherhood, honoring the English orator John Bright and others favoring the Irving Literary Association after Washington Irving. A compromise was struck in which the society was named after Irving, while Bright and the American orator, Charles Sumner, were admitted as the first honorary members. Each of the early sessions was opened with prayer. In 1930 John Andrew Rea recalled:
What I was thinking of most at that time was founding a fraternity and a literary society.  I was Phi Kappa Psi, and wanted Foraker and Buchwalter to come on and join me in founding the New York Alpha, which we did, and we had a great bunch of boys.  The literary society was first in time.  Mr. Williams of our class agitated for the organization of a society under the name "Philanthea".  I was appointed on the committee to report on the name for the second society.  We did not want a Latin or Greek name, for this was a new institution, one that had never existed before.  After much discussion, we went to Mr. White [ Andrew Dickson White ] and told him we were starting a society and he suggested we use the name of "Irving", after the founder of American literature.  The committee accepted it and reported it to the boys and so it was called the Irving Literary Society.  I have no record of the demise of the Irving . . . . There were no other activities than those of the fraternity and the literary society.  That was all we knew anything about; no athletics the first year.  The literary society had public exhibitions with essays, orations, and debates.  They were held downtown.

The first question 'put to the house' in 1869 was "Resolved, the erection of a theatre was not in the interest of promoting correct morals within the University community."  The answer was nodded in the affirmative. The Irving was not to be the venue for the theatre arts at Cornell.
Beginning in February 1870, the Irving and the Philaletheian held their annual contest against each other.  That event has been noted as one reason the quality of debate was so high between 1869 and 1884.  Initially, the Irving's proceedings were held on Friday evenings at Deming Hall, on what is now the Ithaca Commons.  Special events were held at the Cornell Public Library around the corner.  Later it shared Society Hall with the other literary societies at Cornell. The Irving was initially a male-only society, but following the lead of Cornell's Curtis Literary Society (founded in 1872), membership in the Irving became open to women students and remained so throughout its existence.  In 1873, members of the Curtis, Irving and Philaletheian societies jointly founded and ran the Cornell Review, "a repository of original articles, essays, stories, Woodford orations, elaborate discussions, and poems."

Washington Irving's birthday and Cornell's first commencement 

The Irving’s first major event was a celebration of Washington Irving’s Birthday on April 3, 1869, at the Cornell Public Library in downtown Ithaca, New York. Ezra Cornell and Andrew Dickson White both attended.  This event was so well regarded that it was added to the University's annual calendar until the event was eclipsed by the creation of Spring Break.

The first oration "Aristocracy of Sex" explored the natural law-based presumption of male supremacy in American and concluded that the assumption was based solely on "the prejudice of man."   After a musical interlude came an essay on "Our Capital and the War", recalling Washington, D.C. during the American Civil War, including the assassination of President Lincoln.  Then came an oration on "Our National Tendency", namely the tendency of emerging nations to undergo an income a widening gap between rich and poor, and social violence that followed that widening.  The delivery was described by the Society's secretaries in The Cornell Era as "forcible, the orator receiving vigorous applause".  The high point of the first event was a reading from Washington Irving's first major book, A History of New-York from the Beginning of the World to the End of the Dutch Dynasty, by Diedrich Knickerbocker. The event then closed with an oration by the future Judge Morris Lyons Buchwalter, "On The Poles". His speech on extremes in moral and religious sentiment and action drew an analogy with new developments in physics, comparing the extremes to particles of matter vibrating between the poles of a magnet. In their description of Buchwalter's speech, the Society's secretaries wrote:
The orator noted that some favored the gloomy side of human nature, believing man totally depraved.  Others, he said, dwell in the sunshine, seeing nothing but loveliness and purity.  The truth lies somewhere between these extremes. The easy grace of the speaker, the melody of his voice, and the sparkling thought of the oration, captivated the audience.

During the 1869 Commencement Week, the Irving Literary Society invited Theodore Tilton of the New York Independent to speak, Wednesday evening before the Thursday graduation exercises.  Society members gathered with guests again at the Cornell Public Library in downtown Ithaca.  Theodore Tilton spoke on "the human mind, and how to use it." The following day, Tilton stayed for the ceremonies as members of the Irving Literary Society spoke at the actual Commencement ceremony.  Morris Buchwalter spoke on "The Civil Sabbath Law", Joseph Foraker spoke on "Three Hundred Lawyers", and John Andrew Rea gave "A Plea for the Artist".  Buchwalter’s comments were so inflammatory that President White took to the platform before Foraker came to the dais and distanced the Trustees from Buckwalter's oration.  As John Rea recalled: 
President White in the presentation of the diplomas used these words, "Let your course be true." He also said, having in mind Buchwalter's speech, that the young men who made the talks were speaking their own thoughts and that the University was in no way responsible for their sentiments.

Other early exercises
In mid-October 1869, the first regular meeting of the Irving Literary Society was called “A Feast of Reason”.  Festus Walters gave a well-received oration, followed by a scholarly essay.  The question: — ”Resolved that Byron was not a great poet.”  Thomas Wilson Spence earnestly argued the question in the affirmative; Kirk Ingram in the negative.  The question being settled in the negative, Byron was placed in rank with Milton, Shakespeare, Dante, and Goethe, which according to the Cornell Era, “no doubt will cause Byron, if his love of adulation has been interred with his bones, to rest easily in his coffin.  The number of visitors was unusually large, and manifested great interest in the discussion.  The topic for discussion for next Friday evening, is:— ‘Resolved that class feeling and distinctions should not be encouraged in the University.’  A contest was also held between the Irving and its rival, Philalatheian, over the question “Resolved, that increased wealth is beneficial to the morals of a people.”  In 1870, the Irving took up capital punishment and whether it ought to be abolished and the question, “Resolved, That ladies should be admitted to our colleges.” By the end of the second academic year, the Irving diversified activities.  May 1870 saw the first extemporaneous orations, as well as miscellaneous essays such as Edgar Jayne’s “Secret Musings.”  In lieu of the regular debate, the Irving also went into committee-of-the-whole on the Irish question, argument extending beyond midnight. The last event of AY 1869–1870 was a debate on the Protective Tariff.  Later that year, it was resolved after debate that the tendency toward world societies was toward ‘the new Democracy.’

Later exercises

Entering its third decade, the Irving was the largest of the three Cornell literary societies.  It enrolled 26 members during the Fall Term 1880.  The Cornell Daily Sun noted the benefit of the training provided by the experience, the pleasant rooms assigned by University administrators, and the hearty support provided by the Cornell Faculty.  Despite these benefits, the Irving and its peers were losing the interest of the Cornell Student body. That only fourteen percent of Cornell students were active in the societies was seen as an intellectual weakness.  Chief among the greatest distractions were the Greek letter fraternities, whose members lacked time or interest in activities outside their fraternal societies.  With insufficient numbers, society members were required to present or compete every three weeks.  The resulting literary activity was thought to be accordingly weak, further impacting on the quality and subsequent attendance of the  meetings. In this environment, the Irving members invited the Cornell community to listen to debates over questions such as "Which has done most toward the promotion of civilization, Art or Science?"  The elocutionist Robert P. Williams of New York City read before the Irving the same season. At the same time, Cornell students attending the University of Michigan noted that for all their weaknesses, the Irving and its peers compared well against Michigan's literary societies:

"The literary societies—The Webster and The Jeffersonian—are well attended, but neither have as good or as pleasant rooms as the Irving or Curtis.  The grade of exercises is, if anything, lower than in those just mentioned.".

The following Spring 1881 term, the Irving and the Cornell Club (a debating society) resumed their "union meetings" to bring the best of both organizations together for one evening's entertainment.  In May 1882, the Irving hosted a discussant, Professor Shackford, at Association Hall.  The lecture on Transcendentalism gained the interest of Professor Franklin Benjamin Sanborn.  Woodrow Wilson also served as a discussant during this period, in 1886.  Extemporaneous addresses began to resemble those by toastmasters, with topics such as "How to Run A Sailboat".  Readings came from current fiction, and poetry.  "The Critic" still gave his weekly (and scathing) reviews of recent publications, and future music critic and bibliophile, Harry Falkenau, among others, provided music.  Another example of Society activity during this period was the debate on the question, "Resolved, that indiscriminate personal eulogies and public demonstration are unsuitable methods of rewarding great achievements".  Arguing in the affirmative was Elias Leavenworth Elliot, future inventor.  In 1887, the Irving debated "Resolved, is plagiarism morally wrong?"  During this period, Society leadership overlapped with the University's literary pursuits, such as the Cornell Daily Sun.

Final years

By 1885, the other main literary societies at Cornell, the Adelpi, Curtis and Philalatheian had ceased to exist. Around the time of the Curtis' demise in 1881, an address by President White attributed the general decline in student interest for these societies to the growth of fraternities and sororities, decreasing importance placed on the power of oratory, and the development of the seminar system in the University. The Irving continued until 1887, but in 1884 the Ithaca Daily Democrat was already lamenting its decline as well:
The Irving literary society met last evening, but was poorly attended. This institution should be one of the most prosperous student societies in the college, but strange to say, it has deteriorated in point of numbers, and its management has fallen into the hands of technical instead of literary students.

With the move away from the English collegiate model and toward the German seminar system and a greater dedication of resources to the sciences and engineering (including agricultural sciences), campus leaders increasingly expressed concern about falling standards of recitation, elocution and oratory at Cornell.  The quickened pace of Irving exercises during the academic years 1885, 1886 and 1887 coincided with public expression of these concerns, one of which was an editorial in The Cornell Era of October 1, 1886:

The character and quality of the literary work done by Cornell students is inferior, in many respects, to that done by students of other colleges. The reason of this is two-fold and arises from a lack of opportunity and a want of interest, on the part of the students, in that direction. Who is there among us that does not realize the value of being able to address the people on questions of public moment!  Our classes in Elocution and Oratory go a great ways, but the work of the literary society ought to begin here and supplement the work of the class room. Irving Society and the Mock Congress are steps in the right direction, but their influence does not reach far enough. Either the character of their work is not such as to merit the attention of the students, or there is a disability arising from the lack of numbers. In other colleges there are societies that have large circulating libraries and that hold annual society contests. In addition to this, there are inter-collegiate contests and the matter goes so far even, that contestants meet from different states to determine where is the  'prince of college orators'. We have our Inter-collegiate Athletic Sports, why can we not have Intercollegiate Oratorical Contests ?

To appeal to broader audiences, the Irving sponsored events that would be more properly defined as 'popular entertainment' rather than of the traditional literary society genre.  During the Fall Term, 1886, the society hosted Professor Spenser Baird Newberry and his stereopticon entertainments, most notably show featuring vistas of Athens, Constantinople and Egypt.  Newberry’s presentations proved popular enough for the Irving to charge admission.  But the more social activities were still balanced by the more traditional format.  By the winter of 1887, the members settled on a two-part presentation.  The first part would include exercises in parliamentary practice, a paper reading, and perhaps a recitation or debate. Part two would include a social hour with music. Papers included topics such as "Cornell University Lake Survey", "Political History of Japan", "Small Nations", "Influence of the Jesuits on the Five Nations", and "Etching".

The Irving Literary Society's last public meeting was held on May 23, 1887. After that it ceased to exist as a Cornell University society. However, the Cornell University Residence Plan of 1966 describes the Irving Literary Society as "doing business as the New York Alpha Chapter of the Phi Kappa Psi fraternity at Cornell University". and the New York Alpha chapter of Phi Kappa Psi describes itself as having "served as steward of the Irving Literary Society since 1888". The fraternity chapter has also claimed to have been "founded in 1868 through the Irving Literary Society."

Revival application 2014
A group of Cornell University students made application in 2014 to revive The Irving.  Its status as a recognized student organization was pending as of May 2014.

Members' later careers 

After graduating from Cornell, a number of Irving member had careers reflecting the literary and oratorical activities of the Society.

Harry Falkenau (1885), an early defender of Walt Whitman's poetry and one of Cornell's Chimes Masters, went on to a career as a music critic for the Chicago Herald and later as the owner of an antiquarian book shop in Chicago. Francis Whiting Halsey (1873), was a prolific journalist and author who wrote for The New York Times from 1880 to 1896 and served as its literary editor from 1892. Dewitt John Brigham (1870) was an editor and publisher at Cedar Rapids, Iowa.  A member of the Republican Party, Brigham was appointed American Counsel at Aix-La-Chapelle. On his return to Iowa, he served as editor of the Midland Monthly prior to taking the position of State Librarian. Among his works of literature were The Youth of Old Age (1933), awarded outstanding contribution by an Iowa author in 1934.

John Bogert Laurence (1872) was a newspaper man known throughout the West. At Cornell he was elected president of his class in his junior year and was a member of the Psi Upsilon fraternity. In 1883 Laurence moved to Kansas City where he worked as the commercial editor, vice-president, and managing editor of the Kansas City Journal. James L. Knapp (1880) worked for the Philadelphia Evening Public Ledger for over 55 years, between 1880 and 1940 eventually becoming its city editor. He also served  for four years served as the night editor of the Baltimore Sun.  Prior to returning to Cornell for his first reunion in sixty years (1940), Knapp noted to a reporter:

"[we] had no intercollegiate football. We played rugby, which is something like soccer. Drilling was the principal exercise. We had literary societies. Mine was called the Irving Literary Society, and in my Junior year I was editor of its Literary Review. Boys then were much the same as now as regards mischief, but the pranks were different. Ours would probably seem too tame today."

The Irving produced at least one member who later excelled in the mechanics of literary production.  William Henry French became a type founder.  Born in Griggsville, Illinois, French studied at Cornell between 1869 and 1873 and then at the University of Leipzig. On his return to the United States, he became agent and assistant general manager for the Associated Press in Chicago and New York City between 1873 and 1885. After a stint with the Oak Ranch Company, he became  secretary and director of the type founders Barnhart Bros. & Spindler in 1887.  The position at Barnhart established French in the industry, and he was soon a president and director of St. Louis Printer's Supply Company and director and vice president of Fundicion Mexicana de Tipos in Mexico City as well as director of several other American type foundries.

Several of the Irving's former members and orators entered the legal profession. The third president of the Irving Literary Society, Judge Morris Lyon Buchwalter entered the legal profession, as did his college roommate and fellow society member, Senator Joseph Benson Foraker.  So too, did Edward L. Parker (1871), who transferred from Amherst College to Cornell during the University’s first year.  He entered the law office of his father, Perry Greene Parker, a trial lawyer. The younger Parker practiced law for thirty years and was a lecturer in the Buffalo Law School. Frank Harding (1881) attended Albany Law School after graduation from Cornell and was admitted to the bar at Binghamton, New York. He later served as deputy tax collector for Middletown, New York, owned a cigar factory, and became president of the Orange County Trust Company.  Ira Adelbert Place (1881) also became a lawyer. While at Cornell he was a member of Phi Beta Kappa as well as editor of The Cornellian, The Cornell Era, and The Cornell Review. In later years he was a trustee of Cornell. Burton Ellsworth Bennett (1885) was elected Class of 1885 Orator, and delivered the Class Day Oration at commencement.  He also served as editor of the Cornell Daily Sun (1884-1885) and during his senior year was President of the Irving Literary Society. After leaving Cornell he practiced law in New York and later in Seattle.

References 

College literary societies in the United States
Student debating societies
Cornell University student organizations
1868 establishments in New York (state)
1887 disestablishments in New York (state)
Washington Irving